"Old Time's Sake" is a song by American rapper Eminem featuring fellow American rapper and producer Dr. Dre, and is the only promotional (fourth overall) single from the former's Relapse (2009).

Background
News of the song's future release was first published on the official Eminem site on April 30, 2009, as a part of the official countdown. The song features, and is also produced by Dr. Dre. It is one of the only two songs on the album to have guest appearances; the other song, "Crack a Bottle", also features Dr. Dre, as well as 50 Cent.

Reception
The song received mixed reviews from critics. MTV summarized "Old Time's Sake" as "featuring a party vibe". The article went on to describe that "the record has the familiar West Coast bounce, and that Dr. Dre himself leads the song with a 'simple sing-songy flow' as well as adult content." Allmusic highlighted the song. The Guardian was negative: "More troubling is the sense of going through the motions - something that comes with the album's attempts to scandalise, and which seems to have seeped through into the song title" Louis Pattison was also negative: "‘Old Time’s Sake’ with Dre heralds a mid-album slump." Pitchfork was really positive: "the mere fact he's working with Dr. Dre is seen as cause for celebration (the entirety of "Old Time's Sake" is great)." Rolling Stone wrote that the song is "where Dre drops tasteless lines about getting Shady stoned again."

Track listing
Digital single

Personnel
Eric "Jesus" Coomes – guitar, bass
Mark Batson – keyboards
Dawaun Parker – keyboards
Trevor Lawrence – keyboards

Charts

References

2009 singles
Eminem songs
Dr. Dre songs
Songs about drugs
Songs written by Eminem
Songs written by Dr. Dre
Songs written by Mark Batson
Song recordings produced by Dr. Dre
Shady Records singles
Aftermath Entertainment singles
Interscope Records singles
2009 songs